Brenesiella is a fungal genus in the class Sordariomycetes. The relationship of this taxon to other taxa within the class is unknown (incertae sedis). Brenesiella is a monotypic genus, containing the single species Brenesiella erythroxyli, described as new to science by Paul Sydow in 1929.

References

Monotypic Sordariomycetes genera
Sordariomycetes enigmatic taxa